General Nadeem Raza NI(M), HI(M) (Urdu: ندیم رضا) is a retired four-star army general of the Pakistan Army who got commissioned in 10 Sind Regiment in September 1985. He served 17th Chairman Joint Chiefs of Staff Committee. Raza was previously the Corps Commander of the X Corps (Pakistan) and CGS and General Officer Commanding 9th infantry division, Wana and Commandant of the Pakistan Military Academy.

Personal life and education
Raza was born on 23 June 1965 in Wah Cantonment. His father worked at the Pakistan Ordnance Factory Wah Cantonment and his two elder brothers served in the Pakistani military, retiring as a lieutenant colonel and a squadron leader, respectively. Raza excelled academically, and graduated in 1981 from Sir Syed High School Wah Cantonment. He later joined Pakistan Military Academy through 72nd PMA LC as a Gentleman Cadet. In 1994, he attended the Infantry Company Command Course in Germany. He is a graduate of Command and Staff College, Quetta and National Defence University, Islamabad. 

Raza is married to Syeda Bushra Raza, with whom he has four children: Zain, Mahad, Hania, and Sajeel.

Career
In September 1985, Raza was commissioned in the infantry's 10 Sind Regiment.

Nadeem Raza has served on the faculty of the School of Infantry and Tactics, Quetta, Command and Staff College, Quetta, National Defence University, Islamabad.

He also served as Chief of Staff of  I Corps (Pakistan) and brigade commander of 2 AK Brigade situated at Rawalakot.

In December 2016, Raza was promoted to the rank of three star, Lt Gen from Maj Gen while he was serving as the Commandant of Pakistan Military Academy. Lt Gen Nadeem Raza commanded X Corps based in Rawalpindi.

In October 2017, Raza was appointed as 1st Colonel Commandant of the Mujahid Force.

In August 2018, Nadeem Raza was appointed as the Chief of General Staff. He assumed the position on 10 September 2018.

In November 2019, Nadeem Raza was promoted to four-star rank and appointed as the Chairman Joint Chiefs of Staff Committee of the Pakistan Armed Forces. He assumed the coveted position on 27 November 2019.

Awards and decorations

Foreign decorations

Effective dates of promotion

References

National Defence University, Pakistan alumni
Academic staff of the National Defence University, Pakistan
Pakistani generals
Chairmen Joint Chiefs of Staff Committee
Recipients of Hilal-i-Imtiaz
Living people
Pakistan Army personnel
1975 births